Elizabeth Rebecca Scott Harris (born 22 December 1967) is a British Conservative Party politician who was elected at the 2010 general election as the Member of Parliament (MP) for Castle Point. She is the incumbent Comptroller of the Household.

Education
Harris was born in Windsor, Berkshire and was educated at the Hampshire independent boarding school Bedales. She earned her degree from the London School of Economics (BSc).

Business career
Harris spent most of her working life with Phillimore & Co. publishers, working in warehousing as a delivery driver and Sales Rep. Working her way through the ranks of the company she eventually joined the Board as Marketing Director.

Political career
Harris was a Conservative head office campaign co-ordinator during  2000-2001 and Conservative North West London area officer during 2007–2008. She was elected as MP for Castle Point in 2010 with a majority of 7,632. She was re-elected in 2015 with an increased majority, and then again in 2017 with a substantially increased majority.

In 2012, Harris was named by Conservative Home as one of a minority of loyal Conservative backbench MPs not to have voted against the government in any significant rebellions.

She was a member of the Business, Innovation and Skills Committee and has championed the Daylight Saving Bill which, had it passed, would have moved Britain onto Central European Time. On 20 January 2012, the legislation ran out of time to progress, meaning that the United Kingdom would remain on Western European Time. Prior to the EU 2016 referendum Harris stated the intention to campaign for Britain to leave the European Union.

Harris and her entourage recorded video footage of allegedly speeding motorbikers and handed them to the police, after spotting them whilst canvassing for the 2015 general election. Local residents had complained of the street being used for road racing.

Harris was appointed as the Parliamentary Private Secretary to the Secretary of State for Northern Ireland, Theresa Villiers on 28 May 2015.

Harris was appointed Parliamentary Private Secretary to the newly appointed Secretary of State for Communities and Local Government, Sajid Javid MP in July 2016.

Prior to the General Election in May 2015, Harris was named as the Member of Parliament with the 4th highest voting record in the country.

She was re-elected at the 2017 and 2019 general election; at the latter, Harris won 76.7% of the vote, the largest Conservative vote share of the entire election.

References

External links
Rebecca Harris MP Conservative Party profile
Castle Point Conservatives

1967 births
Living people
People educated at Bedales School
Alumni of the London School of Economics
Conservative Party (UK) MPs for English constituencies
Female members of the Parliament of the United Kingdom for English constituencies
21st-century British women politicians
UK MPs 2010–2015
UK MPs 2015–2017
UK MPs 2017–2019
UK MPs 2019–present
21st-century English women
21st-century English people